Caversham may refer to:

Caversham, Reading, in Berkshire, England
Caversham (Reading ward), an electoral ward 
Caversham, New Zealand, a suburb of Dunedin
Caversham (New Zealand electorate), an electoral constituency in New Zealand
Caversham, Western Australia, a suburb of Perth

Also
Caversham AFC, an association football club in New Zealand
Caversham Airfield, a former Air Force base and motor racing circuit at Caversham in Western Australia
Caversham Bridge, a bridge across the River Thames in England
Caversham Court, a public garden and now-demolished mansion located on the north bank of the River Thames in Caversham, on the outskirts of Reading, England
Caversham International Tennis Tournament, a professional tennis tournament held in Jersey, Channel Islands
Caversham Lakes, a set of lakes created through gravel extraction between the suburb of Caversham in Reading, Berkshire and the hamlet of Sonning Eye in Oxfordshire, just north of the River Thames
Caversham Lock, a lock and weir situated on the River Thames in England at Reading, Berkshire
Caversham Park, a Victorian stately home with parkland in the suburb of Caversham, on the outskirts of Reading, England
Caversham Park Village, a community in the suburb of Caversham, on the outskirts of Reading, England
Viscount Caversham, a subsidiary title of the Earl Cadogan